Carbon Run is a tributary of Shamokin Creek in Northumberland County, Pennsylvania, in the United States. Carbon Run is impaired due to metals from acid mine drainage, which colors the stream orange. Metals such as manganese, iron, aluminum, and others occur within its water. The watershed of the stream is in the Coal Region of Pennsylvania. Much of the area in the vicinity of the stream consists of spoil piles and abandoned mining land.

Carbon Run is especially prone to flooding, more so than other streams in its area. Two passive treatment systems have been installed on the stream. A number of bridges and masonry walls have been constructed over and on it. The watershed of the stream is designated as a Coldwater Fishery and a Migratory Fishery. There are no trout inhabiting the stream, but a few fish species and macroinvertebrate taxa have been observed in it.

Course

Carbon Run begins in a small lake in Zerbe Township. It flows south for several hundred feet and enters a broad valley. The stream then flows in an east-northeasterly direction for a few miles, though it heads in other directions for short distances. In this reach, it enters Coal Township, receives two unnamed tributaries from the left, and passes through two small lakes. The stream then turns south-southeast for a few tenths of a mile before turning east-northeast again. Its valley narrows and it reaches the census-designated place of Fairview-Ferndale. The stream flows alongside Pennsylvania Route 125 for several tenths of a mile before turning north and entering Shamokin. Several tenths of a mile further downstream, it turns northwest and reaches its confluence with Shamokin Creek.

Hydrology
The entire length of Carbon Run is designated as an impaired waterbody. The cause of the impairment is metals other than mercury and the source of the impairment is abandoned mine drainage. Its two unnamed tributaries are also impaired. The stream is impacted by acid mine drainage and the Sterling Mine discharge is in its watershed. The acid mine drainage causes it to have an orange color.

This load requires a 90 percent reduction to meet the total maximum daily load requirements.

The concentrations of recoverable sodium and potassium in Carbon Run at Shamokin were once measured to be .

In 1999 and 2000, the pH of the stream at Shamokin ranged from 6.3 to 6.8.

The concentration of phosphorus in Carbon Run at Shamokin was once measured to be , while the concentration of orthophosphate was less than  both times it was measured. The concentration of ammonia in the stream was once measured to be .

In 1999 and 2000, the instantaneous discharge of Carbon Run at Shamokin ranged from  during three measurements. The specific conductance of the stream ranged from 650 to 757 micro-siemens per centimeter at  during four measurements. The turbidity of the stream ranged from 14 to 44 Nephelometric Turbidity Units.

Geography and geology
Carbon Run is a relatively small stream.

There is a dam known as the Bear Valley Dam located on Carbon Run. Spoil piles and abandoned mining land occupies much of the stream's watershed. In some reaches, the stream flows underground due to infiltration into mine pools, but returns to the surface in the form of a discharge. An anticlinal known as Anticlinal No. 8 or Red Ridge ends at the valley of Carbon Run.

There are fifteen abandoned mine drainage discharges in the watershed of Carbon Run. There are also a number of small lakes in the watershed. It is at least partially in the Coal Region. There is a coal field between the stream and the summit of Mahanoy Mountain.

Watershed
The mouth of the stream is in the United States Geological Survey quadrangle of Shamokin. However, the source is in the quadrangle of Trevorton.

There are two passive treatment systems in the watershed of Carbon Run. They have helped to reduce the stream's acidity and made it able to support aquatic plant and animal life.

Carbon Run is more prone to flooding than any other stream in its vicinity. Its floodplain is distinguishable on Federal Flood Insurance Maps.

History and recreation
Carbon Run was entered into the Geographic Names Information System on August 2, 1979. Its identifier in the Geographic Names Information System is 1171191.

In 1993, a bridge of the same type, but carrying Chestnut Street, was constructed over the stream in Shamokin. This bridge carries Arch Street.

Masonry retaining walls were built on Carbon Run during the Great Depression. A reach of Carbon Run was impacted by flooding in September 2011. The Pennsylvania Department of Conservation and Natural Resources has awarded a $353,000 grant for stream improvements to Carbon Run. These floods also damaged the stream's retaining walls.

The Adventure Anthracite Outdoor Area is in the vicinity of Carbon Run. Non-motorized activities, such as hiking and horseback riding are banned in the area, but there are future plans to accommodate them.

Biology
The drainage basin of Carbon Run is designated as a Coldwater Fishery and a Migratory Fishery. The fish populations in the stream are considerably lower than those of other streams of a similar size in the area. In 2011, the defunct organization Habitat for Wildlife released a thousand small brook trout ( in length) from the Zion Grove Trout Hatchery into the stream. However, by September 2012, electrofishing surveys failed to find any trout. In 2012, it was possible that the stream would be stocked with trout in spring 2013 to give the area a "mental boost".

It is difficult for fish to survive in Carbon Run because it contains few of the varieties of insects that fish tend to eat. However, in 2011, satisfactory insect populations were observed. However, a few fish species have been observed in the stream. These include creek chubs, pumpkinseeds, and brown bullheads. Creek chubs are abundant in the stream, meaning that more than 75 individuals were observed. Pumpkinseeds were common, meaning that 25 to 75 individuals were observed. However, only one brown bullhead was found. Some time ago, in 1840, Carbon Run was "filled with trout".

Macroinvertebrates began to repopulate Carbon Run by the 2000s due to the passive treatment systems in the watershed. In the 1990s, three individuals from the genus Tipula, an individual from the family Rhyacophilidae, and an individual from the order Plecoptera were observed in the stream upstream of Scarlift Discharge 42. A small unnamed tributary to Carbon Run hosted various caddisflies, mayflies, stoneflies, and minnows. However, immediately downstream of Scarlift Discharge 42, no macroinvertebrates were observed.

See also
Furnace Run, next tributary of Shamokin Creek going downstream
Coal Run, next tributary of Shamokin Creek going upstream
List of rivers of Pennsylvania
List of tributaries of Shamokin Creek

References

External links
USGS 01554482 Carbon Run near Trevorton, PA

Rivers of Northumberland County, Pennsylvania
Tributaries of Shamokin Creek
Rivers of Pennsylvania